Chumical is a corregimiento in Las Minas District, Herrera Province, Panama with a population of 665 as of 2010. Its population as of 1990 was 645; its population as of 2000 was 699.

References

Corregimientos of Herrera Province